The Embassy of the State of Palestine in Bahrain is the diplomatic mission of the Palestine in Bahrain. It is located in Manama.

See also

List of diplomatic missions in Bahrain.
List of diplomatic missions of Palestine.

References

Diplomatic missions of the State of Palestine
Diplomatic missions in Bahrain
Bahrain–State of Palestine relations